State Highway 55 (SH 55) is a  long state highway in the U.S. state of Colorado. SH 55's southern terminus is at County Route 51 northeast of Fleming, and the northern terminus is at SH 138 in Crook. It serves as a connector between Crook and Interstate 76 (I-76).

Route description

SH 55 runs , starting at a junction with U.S. Highway 138 in Crook, then south across the South Platte River to I-76.  The highway ends at CR 51 northeast of Fleming.

Major intersections

References

External links

055
Transportation in Logan County, Colorado